Miss Indonesia 2020, the 16th edition of the Miss Indonesia pageant, was held on February 20, 2020 at MNC Studio, Kebon Jeruk, Jakarta. Princess Megonondo of Jambi  crowned her successor, Pricilia Carla Yules of South Sulawesi at the end of the event. She represented Indonesia at Miss World 2021 where she placed in the Top 6. Miss World 2019, Toni-Ann Singh of Jamaica attended the awarding night.

Judges  
 Liliana Tanoesoedibjo, founder and chairman of Miss Indonesia Organization.
 Peter F. Saerang, professional make-up and hairstylist.
 Ferry Salim, actor, entrepreneur, and ambassador of UNICEF to Indonesia.
 Harry Darsono, Fashion Designer.
 Maria Harfanti, Miss Indonesia 2015, 2nd-Runner-up Miss World 2015, Miss World Asia 2015.
 Natasha Mannuela Halim, Miss Indonesia 2016, 2nd-Runner-up Miss World 2016, Miss World Asia 2016.

Result

Placements

Order Announcements

Top 16

 Maluku Utara§
 South Sumatera §
 Aceh §
 South Sulawesi §
 East Nusa Tengga §
 Central Sulawesi §
 Central Java
 Central Kalimantan
 North Sumatera
 North Sulawesi
 West Nusa Tenggara
 Jambi
 West Kalimantan
 Bangka Belitung Islands
 West Java
 Lampung
§ Placed into the Top 16 by Fast Track

Top 5 

 North Sumatera
 Jambi
 East Nusa Tenggara
 South Sulawesi
 Bangka Belitung Islands

Fast Track Event
Fast track events held during preliminary round and the winners of Fast Track events are automatically qualified to enter the semifinal round. This year's fast track events include : Talent, Catwalk (Modeling), Sports, Nature and Beauty Fashion, Social Media, And Beauty with a Purpose.

Special Awards 
Special Awards include 3 Category :

Contestants 
Contestants of Miss Indonesia 2020 from 34 provinces in Indonesia.

References

External links 
 Official site

2020 beauty pageants
Miss Indonesia